Gavin McMahon (born 22 January 1975) is a former Australian rules footballer who played with the Sydney Swans in the Australian Football League (AFL).

McMahon was recruited from East Wagga-Kooringal. A half back, he made two appearances in the 1993 AFL season and played three games in 1994.

References

1975 births
Living people
Australian rules footballers from New South Wales
Sydney Swans players